Eelanatham is a Tamil language newspaper.It is  known for promoting a Tamil nationalist prospective and a pro-LTTE stance.The newspaper has been attacked several times, a number of its staff have been murdered by paramilitary groups and other forces.

References

Tamil-language newspapers published in Sri Lanka
Daily newspapers published in Sri Lanka